PlayStation Experience, also known as PSX, is an annual event for the video game industry presented by Sony Interactive Entertainment used to reveal and advertise PlayStation games and game-related merchandise. The event is open to the public and showcases various panels and many unreleased games, with playable demos.

England

2002
The first PlayStation Experience was held alongside the European Computer Trade Show at the Earls Court Exhibition Centre in August 2002. Over 20,000 people attended over the three days.

2003
The second PlayStation Experience took place at the Earls Court Exhibition Centre as part of London Games Week, from August 28–31, 2003.

North America

2014
PlayStation Experience returned in the United States, at Sands Expo in Las Vegas, Nevada from December 6–7, 2014, marking the 20th anniversary of the PlayStation.

Exhibitors

2015
The second PlayStation Experience event was held at Moscone Center in San Francisco, California from December 5–6, 2015.

Exhibitors

2016
The third PlayStation Experience event was held at Anaheim Convention Center in Anaheim, California from December 3–4, 2016.

Exhibitors

2017
The fourth PlayStation Experience event was held again at Anaheim Convention Center in Anaheim, California from December 9–10, 2017.

South East Asia

2017
The first South East Asia PlayStation Experience event was held at KL Live in Kuala Lumpur, Malaysia from August 5, 2017.

Exhibitors

2018
The second South East Asia PlayStation Experience event was held at GMM Live House in Bangkok, Thailand between August 18–19, 2018.

Exhibitors

References

Gaming conventions
Multigenre conventions